Droppin Bombs is a compilation album by Suburban Noize Records, released on August 29, 2006. The album is a twenty track collaboration between all the artists signed to Suburban Noize Records. In the week of September 16, 2006, Droppin Bombs had reached #38 on the Billboard's Independent Albums chart and #44 on the Billboard's Top Heatseekers chart.

Track listing

References

2006 mixtape albums
Suburban Noize Records albums